My Name Is Legion is an anthology of three stories by American writer Roger Zelazny, compiled in 1976. The stories feature a common protagonist who is never named.

Plot summary

The protagonist of these stories is involved in the creation of a global computer network designed to give ultimate economic control by keeping track of all human activity. Just before the system goes live, the hero expresses his concerns about the possible misuse of such power to his superior, who gives the hero the chance to destroy his personal data before it is to be entered into the system. In taking this step the hero becomes non-existent as far as the system is concerned. Using backdoors in the central network, the hero is able to create identities for himself as needed. With this freedom he sets himself up as a freelance investigator and problem solver.

Stories 

The following stories are included in the anthology:

 "The Eve of RUMOKO": Project RUMOKO is a plan to use nuclear explosives to create artificial islands; the hero must identify and stop a saboteur on the project.
 "'Kjwalll'kje'k'koothai'lll'kje'k": At a research station in the Bahamas a diver has died, apparently in an attack by a dolphin... But dolphins do not attack humans, and someone suspects foul play.
 "Home Is the Hangman": A sentient space-exploration robot, lost years before, has apparently returned to Earth. One of its original designers has died under suspicious circumstances. Has the Hangman returned to kill its creators? The hero must find the Hangman and stop it, and time is running out. This story won the 1976 Hugo Award for Best Novella.

In popular culture 
 In the film Phantasm, a copy of the book is clearly seen on Mike Pearson's nightstand.

References

1976 short story collections
Short story collections by Roger Zelazny
Hugo Award for Best Novella winning works
Nebula Award for Best Novella-winning works
Ballantine Books books